Himerius (Imier, Imerio) of Cremona (d. June 17, ca. 560), also known as Himerius of Amelia or Irnerius, was an Italian bishop. He is venerated as a saint by the Roman Catholic Church and Christian communities of Western Rite Orthodoxy.

A native of Calabria, Himerius was a monk at Amelia before being appointed bishop there.  He is described as having been an extremely austere, ascetic personality, both in regard to himself and others.

Veneration

Himerius' name does not appear in the ancient martyrologies.  However, his name appears in the Roman Martyrology.

An abbot named Ambrose (Ambrogio), who lived around the twelfth century, wrote a Vita of Himerius, but only its prologue remains.  A later bishop of Amelia, Antonio Maria Graziano (1592–1611), also wrote a biography of the saint.

Around 965, Himerius' relics were moved from Amelia to Cremona by Liutprand (Liutprando, Luizo), bishop of Cremona from 962 to 972.  They were interred in a church that was later destroyed.  Rediscovered in 1129, they were placed in a sepulcher.  A monk named John (Giovanni) wrote, in the 12th century, a collection of miracles performed by the saint after this rediscovery of the relics.  This was composed during the episcopate of the Cremonese bishop Offredo (1168–1185).

In 1196, Sicardo, another bishop of Cremona, placed the relics of Himerius in an archway of stone along with those of a martyr named Archelaus (Archelao) and consecrated an altar in their honor.

The monastery of Sant'Imerio was built in Cremona in 1606 to house members of the Order of the Discalced Carmelites.

See also 
Western Rite Orthodoxy
St. Fructus (Frutos)

Notes

External links
Saint of the Day, June 17: Himerius (Imier) of Cremona at SaintPatrickDC.org
 Sant'Imerio di Amelia
Latin Saints of the Orthodox Patriarchate of Rome page

Medieval Italian saints
Bishops in Umbria
6th-century Italian bishops
560 deaths
People from Calabria
6th-century Christian saints
Year of birth unknown